Siemens Mobile was a German mobile phone manufacturer and a division of Siemens AG. Siemens sold Siemens Mobile to the Taiwan-based BenQ in 2005, subsequently becoming BenQ-Siemens and succeeded by Gigaset. The last Siemens-branded mobile phones, the AL21, A31 and AF51, were released in November 2005.

History
The first Siemens mobile phone, the Siemens Mobiltelefon C1, was launched in 1985. In 1994 the Siemens S1 GSM phone was launched. In 1997 Siemens launched the first phone with a colour screen, the Siemens S10, with a screen capable of displaying red, green, blue and white. In the same year Siemens launched the first "outdoor" phone, the Siemens S10 Active, with enhanced shock, dust and splash protection. Siemens launched the first slider phone, the Siemens SL10, in 1999.

Siemens acquired the mobile phone division of Bosch in 2000. In the same year Siemens launched one of the first phones with an MP3 player and external memory card support (MultiMediaCard), the Siemens SL45.

In 2003 Siemens launched its first phone running on the Symbian OS operating system, the Siemens SX1. The phone featured hot swappable MultiMediaCard. In the same year Siemens launched the Xelibri range of fashion phones. In 2005 Siemens launched the first phone with real GPS support, the Siemens SXG75.

As of Q3 2000, Siemens had an 8.6% mobile handset market share, putting it behind Ericsson, Motorola and Nokia. For the calendar year 2003, Siemens was again fourth behind Samsung, Motorola and Nokia, with a figure of 8.5%. In 2004 it decreased to 7.2%. Siemens Mobile was making large losses and plummeting sales at this time. By the first quarter of 2005, market share was down to 5.6% as it fell behind competitors LG and Sony Ericsson. Their Xelibri range of phones, which was the company's answer to the fashionable handset trend at the time, became a costly failure.

On 7 June 2005, the Taiwanese company BenQ agreed to acquire the loss-making Siemens Mobile from Siemens, together with exclusive right to use the Siemens trademark on its mobile phones for 5 years. Before transferring the mobile phone subsidiary to BenQ, Siemens invested 250 million euros and wrote down assets amounting to 100 million euros. Siemens also acquired a 2.5% stake in BenQ for 50 million euros. BenQ subsequently released mobile phones under the BenQ-Siemens brand, from its German unit. In 2006 the German unit of BenQ filed for bankruptcy.

Siemens restarted the production of mobile phones under the Gigaset brand name.

Products

Classifications 
Depending on their name, the Siemens mobiles have the following classifications:

 A series: low-cost phones with basic functionality. 
 C series: mid-range phones.
 M series: phones with military specifications for outdoor activities. 
 S series: flagship phones 
 U series: UMTS devices manufactured in 2003 by Motorola Mobility, USA and rebranded under "Siemens" name.
 Secondary alphabet position initials 
 xF Cradle phones
 xL Sliding phones. (Exceptions: Siemens SL45 , Siemens CL75 )
 xX Phones with advanced features.
 xK Phones with a full QWERTY keyboard ( Siemens SK65 )

Within a class, the numbers have the following meaning: 

 The first digit (1-9) denotes the level of functionality of the phone.
 The second digit indicates the generation of the phone. The phones are also of the first generation of the model, containing the numbers 1, 6, 8.

List of products 
Siemens A31
Siemens A35
Siemens A36
Siemens A40
Siemens A50: one of the most popular Siemens phones, Shares same hardware as C45 and can be upgraded to C45 by firmware flash.
Siemens A51
Siemens A52: monochrome, GSM 900 / GSM 1800, no GPRS, no USB, IrDA or Bluetooth. Same as A55/A56
Siemens A53
Siemens A55: monochrome, GSM 900 / GSM 1800, no GPRS, no USB, no IrDA or Bluetooth. Shares same hardware as C55 and can be upgraded to C55 by firmware flash.
Siemens A56: monochrome, GSM 850 / GSM 1900, no GPRS, no USB, no IrDA or Bluetooth. Shares same hardware as C56 and can be upgraded to C56 by firmware flash.
Siemens A56i
Siemens A57
Siemens A60
Siemens A62
Siemens A65:  CSTN 101x80 display, Triband (900 / 1800 / 1900)
Siemens A70, last Siemens with monochrome display, Triband (900 / 1800 / 1900), completely unrelated to the A55/C55.
Siemens A75
Siemens AF51
Siemens AP75 (Developed by BenQ, same with BenQ M580)
Siemens AL21/AL21 Hello Kitty (TFT 130x130 display, GSM 900 / 1800 / 1900, no camera (same as CF110))
Siemens AX72
Siemens AX75 (taking pictures supported when connected with the QuickPic IQP-500 external accessories camera module like S55, S57, CF62 etc.)
Siemens C1
Siemens C2
Siemens C3
Siemens C4
Siemens C5
Siemens C10
Siemens C11
Siemens C25
Siemens C28
Siemens C30
Siemens C35
Siemens C35i
Siemens C45
Siemens C55: monochrome, GSM 900 / GSM 1800, with GPRS, no USB, no IrDA or Bluetooth. One of the most popular Siemens phones
Siemens C56: monochrome, GSM 850 / GSM 1900, with GPRS, no USB, no IrDA or Bluetooth.
Siemens C60
Siemens C61
Siemens C62 (Co-developed with Sony Ericsson sameness platform with T600, T610i)
Siemens C65
Siemens C66
Siemens C70: Identical hardware to C65
Siemens C71
Siemens C72
Siemens C75
Siemens CC75 (cancelled)
Siemens CF62
Siemens CF65
Siemens CF75 (CF65 based)
Siemens CF110: TFT 130x130 display, GSM 900 / 1800 / 1900, no camera
Siemens CFX65 (the first Siemens clamshells form factor with built in VGA camera and flash. CFX65 is the only model of Siemens that had a torch, you close the flip and double press volume the up key to start the torch.)
Siemens CL50 (Developed By Arista)
Siemens CL55 (Developed By LG Electronics )
Siemens CL75, CL75 Black Edition, CL75 Poppy Edition
Siemens CX65: TFT 132x176 display, GSM 900 / 1800 / 1900, VGA (640 x 480 pixel) camera, IRDA (Based on M65)
Siemens CX66 (minor changes for some countries)
Siemens CX70: TFT 132x176 display, GSM 900 / 1800 / 1900, VGA (640 x 480 pixel) camera, IRDA (Identical hardware to CX65)
Siemens CX70 Emoty (in the CX70 family’s)
Siemens CXV70 (in the CX70 family’s for Vodafone)
Siemens CXT70 (in the CX70 family’s for T-Mobile)
Siemens CXO70 (in the CX70 family’s for O2)
Siemens CX75
Siemens E10
Siemens M30: one of the most popular Siemens phones
Siemens M35
Siemens M35i: one of the most popular Siemens phones
Siemens M45
Siemens M50
Siemens M55 Scorpions
Siemens M56: GSM 850 / GSM 1900 version of M55.  Note that it is not triband.
Siemens M65
Siemens M65 Rescue Edition
Siemens M75
Siemens MC60
Siemens ME45
Siemens ME75 (C75 Based)
Siemens MT50
Siemens P1
Siemens S1
Siemens S3
Siemens S3 COM 1995
Siemens S4
Siemens S6
Siemens S10
Siemens S15
Siemens S25
Siemens S35i
Siemens S40
Siemens S42
Siemens S45
Siemens S45i
Siemens S46
Siemens S55 (Fully wireless connections with Bluetooth 1.1 and IrDA port)
Siemens S55 Formula One
Siemens S56
Siemens S57 (Only IrDA port supportable)
Siemens S65
Siemens S65 DVBH, SXX65 (Concept phone) run on LINUX
Siemens S66 (Minor-changes for some countries), S66 or S65 (for Xingular)
Siemens S68 (rebranding and selling in BenQ-Siemens S68, the SP65 successors)
Siemens S75 ( FE75 Internal pre-models)
Siemens SF65 (co-development with Philips N.V. (France), the same models with Philips 760 twists)
Siemens SFG75 (Developed by BenQ, same with BenQ S80 UMTS)
Siemens SG75 (cancelled, in the same family with SXG75)
Siemens SK65, SK6B and SK6R (Co-development with The RIM BlackBerry and run parallels between “Siemens_X65 platform” and “BlackBerry 3.8 OS“. Select  BB Icons on Main Menu then press “Option”-> “About” for the BBOS version pre installed info.)
Siemens SK65 Burlwood Editions
Siemens SP65 (S65 without Camera)
Siemens SL10: the world firstly sliding mobile phone with a four-colour screen (Red, Green, Blue and White)
Siemens SL42
Siemens SL45: the worlds first phone with an MP3 Player
Siemens SL45i
Siemens SL55
Siemens SL56: the American version of the Siemens SL55, available only on AT&T.
Siemens SL65: TFT 130x130 display, GSM 900 / 1800 / 1900, VGA (640 x 480 pixel) camera, IRDA, slider form factor
Siemens SL65 ESCADA Edition
Siemens SL75/ SL7C
Siemens SL80 (re-branding and selling in BenQ-Siemens SL80 Hello Kitty Edition)
Siemens SLV140 (re-branding and selling in BenQ-Siemens EF81)
Siemens ST55 (ODM Developed By Arista)
Siemens ST60 (For T-Mobile)
Siemens SX1, first and only smartphone developed and produced by Siemens AG, run on Symbian OS
Siemens SX2 (cancelled) run on Symbian OS
Siemens SX45 (Developed by hTC, run on Windows Mobile 2003 Edition)
Siemens SX56 (Developed by hTC, run on Windows Mobile 5.0 Edition)
Siemens SX66 (Developed by hTC, run on Windows Mobile 5.0 Edition can upgradable to WM 6.0 Edition)
Siemens SXG75 (The first Siemens with BrewOS by Qualcomm and build internal GPS real-time functions.)
Siemens SXX75 (Concept phone, Full touchscreen-slides platform. runs on BrewOS by Qualcomm)
Siemens U10 (UMTS)(The first Siemens UMTS (3G) model’s run on Moto Linux platform A and it was developed by Motorola Mobility.)
Siemens U15 (The second Siemens UMTS (3G) model’s run on Moto Linux platform A, and it was developed by Motorola Mobility.)
Xelibri X1
Xelibri X2
Xelibri X3
Xelibri X4
Xelibri X5
Xelibri X6
Xelibri X7
Xelibri X8

Gallery

References 

German brands
Defunct mobile phone manufacturers
Mobile phone companies of Germany
Telecommunications companies established in 1985
Companies disestablished in 2005
Consumer electronics brands
1985 establishments in Germany